Yan Wong is an evolutionary biologist, the television presenter of Bang Goes the Theory and co-author of The Ancestor's Tale with Richard Dawkins.

References

Living people
Evolutionary biologists
Year of birth missing (living people)
Alumni of the University of Oxford
Academics of the University of Leeds
Chinese emigrants to the United Kingdom